Tapestry Revisited: A Tribute to Carole King is a 1995 tribute album honoring American singer, songwriter, and pianist Carole King. It features a diverse lineup of artists including Richard Marx, Aretha Franklin, Rod Stewart, Celine Dion, The Bee Gees and Amy Grant. The idea of this release was to re-create King's 1971 album Tapestry track-for-track using other artists.

The album peaked at number 53 on the Billboard 200 and was certified Gold by the RIAA in the United States.

Track listing

Charts

References 

Carole King tribute albums
1995 compilation albums
Pop rock compilation albums
Atlantic Records compilation albums
Albums produced by Stewart Lerman
Albums produced by David Foster
Albums produced by Arif Mardin
Albums produced by Richard Marx